The FC Basel 1920–21 season was their twenty-eighth season since the club's foundation on 15 November 1893. The club's chairman was Franz Rinderer who took over from Bernard Klingelfuss. FC Basel played their home games in the Landhof in the district Wettstein in Kleinbasel.

Overview 
Walter Dietrich was team captain and acted as coach. Basel played a total of 40 matches in their 1919–20 season, scoring 80 goals and conceded 62. 14 of these matches plus the playoff were in the domestic league and the other 25 were friendly matches.

Of these 25 friendlies, 13 were played against German teams, one was against AS Strasbourg and one was against Juventus. The game against Juventus was played in the Olympique de la Pontaise. Just before the end of the season Basel made a tour of north Germany and played three games in four days against Hannover 96, Victoria Hamburg and Kieler SV Holstein. 10 were home games played in the Landhof and 15 were away games. 15 of these games ended with a victory, six were drawn and only four ended with a defeat. In these test games Basel scored a total of 60 goals and conceded 33. Otto Kuhn played in 24 of these games scoring 13 times and Karl Wüthrich played in 19 test games scoring 20 times, which means that these two players scored more than half of the team's goals.

The domestic league, Swiss Serie A 1920–21, was divided into three regional groups, East, Central and West, each group with eight teams. FC Basel and two other teams from Basel Nordstern and Old Boys were allocated to the Central group. The other teams playing in this group were the two teams from the capital, Young Boys Bern and FC Bern as well as Aarau, Luzern and Biel-Bienne. 

As opposed to the good results in the friendly games, Basel played a very bad season. Eight of the first ten games ended in a defeat, in fact the first victory was the eleventh round match against FC Bern. Basel only moved off the last position in the league table because they won the playoff against Luzern. They ended the season in second last position with just six points. They only won two championship matches, drawing two and suffering ten defeats. In their 14 games Basel scored just 18 goals and conceded 29. Karl Wüthrich was the team's top league goal scorer with 8 goals. The reigning champions Young Boys won the group and continued to the finals. Despite the victory against Servette, the Young Boys lost 3–1 against Grasshopper Club who therefore became the new Swiss champions.

Players 
Squad members

Results 

Legend

Friendly matches

Pre- and mid season

Winter break and mid-season

Serie A

Central Group results

Last-place play-off

Central Group league table

See also
 History of FC Basel
 List of FC Basel players
 List of FC Basel seasons

References

Sources 
 Rotblau: Jahrbuch Saison 2014/2015. Publisher: FC Basel Marketing AG. 
 Die ersten 125 Jahre. Publisher: Josef Zindel im Friedrich Reinhardt Verlag, Basel. 
 FCB team 1920–21 at fcb-archiv.ch
 Switzerland 1920-21 at RSSSF

External links
 FC Basel official site

FC Basel seasons
Basel